Urkabustaiz is a municipality located in the province of Araba (Álava), in the Basque Country, northern Spain. Its capital is the town of Izarra.

Councils 
The municipality consists of 12 towns governed by 10 administrative boards. As of 2018, their populations are as follows:

References

External links
 URKABUSTAIZ in the Bernardo Estornés Lasa - Auñamendi Encyclopedia (Euskomedia Fundazioa) 

Municipalities in Álava